Daniel Szczepan (born 5 June 1995) is a Polish professional footballer who plays as a forward for Ruch Chorzów.

Senior career

Szczepan began his career with Wodzisław Śląski. Szczepan moved to Górnik Pszów in 2011, where he made his debut in 2012 against Naprzód Rydułtowy, a team located in the town of his birth, a game in which Szczepan also scored. In total Szczepan played 35 games for Górnik, scoring 10 goals. On 5 February 2015, Szczepan joined GKS Jastrzębie. After starting well with Jastrzębie, Szczepan knocked out an opposition player in a friendly for the 2015–16 season against Unia Racibórz. In total Szczepan scored just under one goal every two games for GKS. After a successful time with Jastrzębie, Szczepan joined Śląsk Wrocław in 2018.

References

1995 births
GKS Jastrzębie players
Śląsk Wrocław players
Ruch Chorzów players
Ekstraklasa players
I liga players
II liga players
III liga players
Polish footballers
People from Rydułtowy
Association football forwards
Living people